Sağlıca is a village in the Tercan District, Erzincan Province, Turkey. The village is populated by Kurds of the Çarekan and Haydaran tribes and had a population of 31 in 2021.

The hamlet of Telli is attached to the village.

References 

Villages in Tercan District
Kurdish settlements in Erzincan Province